Juan Manuel Mata Rodríguez (born 27 April 1964) is a Spanish former professional footballer who played as a forward.

Early and personal life
Born in Oviedo, Mata is the father of footballer Juan Mata.

Career
Mata played for Real Oviedo, Oviedo Aficionados, Real Burgos, Orihuela Deportiva, Salamanca, Cartagena and Langreo.

Later life
He later co-owned a tapas restaurant in Manchester, England.

References

1964 births
Living people
Spanish footballers
Real Oviedo players
Real Oviedo Vetusta players
Real Burgos CF footballers
Orihuela Deportiva CF footballers
UD Salamanca players
Cartagena FC players
UP Langreo footballers
Segunda División players
Segunda División B players
Association football forwards